Green bean galaxies (GBGs) are very rare astronomical objects that are thought to be quasar ionization echos. They were discovered by Mischa Schirmer and colleagues R. Diaz, K. Holhjem, N.A. Levenson, and C. Winge. The authors report the discovery of a sample of Seyfert-2 galaxies with ultra-luminous galaxy-wide narrow-line regions (NLRs) at redshifts z=0.2-0.6.

While examining survey images taken with the 3.6-meter Canada-France-Hawaii Telescope (CFHT) atop 4200-m Mauna Kea, Hawaii, Schirmer noticed a galaxy with unusual colors—strongly peaking in the r filter, suggesting a spectral line. In fact, the color is quite similar to the Green Pea galaxies (GPs), which are compact star-forming galaxies. However, the object which became known as a GBG is much larger.

These galaxies are so rare that there is on average only one in a cube about 1.3 billion light-years across. They were nicknamed GBGs because of their color and because they are superficially similar to, but larger than, GPs. The interstellar gas in most GPs is ionized by UV-light from intense star formation, whereas the gas in GBGs is ionized by hard x-rays from an active galactic nucleus (AGN). The scarcity of GBGs indicates that this phenomenon is very rare, and/or very short-lived.

GBGs are likely related to the object known as Hanny's Voorwerp, another possible quasar ionization echo. GBGs are substantially different, though, as their luminosities, sizes and gas masses are 10-100 times higher than in other quasar ionisation clouds, for instance the 154 studied in Keel et al. 2012 (nicknamed 'voorwerpjes'). These 'voorwerpjes' are estimated to have bright phases that last between ~20,000 and 200,000 years.

Possible formation mechanisms are currently under investigation. Likely, the giant gas outflows have been produced during the last stages in the life of super-luminous quasars, which subsequently experienced a rapid shut-down, e.g. due to a process known as AGN feedback. The escaping X-rays from the former very active quasar state still ionize the gas, causing the ionization echo.

Sloan Digital Sky Survey (SDSS) identifications

VLT/XSHOOTER spectrum of Green Bean Galaxy J2240-0927 

On the left is the spectrum of the astronomical object J224024.1-092748 (hereafter: J2240). It was acquired using the Very Large Telescope and XSHOOTER, a multi wavelength (300-2500 nm) medium resolution spectrograph. The J2240 spectrum shows 3 bandwidths: UVB (Ultraviolet B which are medium UV wavelengths between 315 – 280 nm), VIS (the visible spectrum) and NIR (Near Infrared, which have wavelengths of 0.75–1.4 µm).

In the spectrum of J2240, the black line represents the galaxy center, integrated to within ±4.5 kpc (kilo-parsec) of the nucleus, while the blue line has been integrated over 7.6 kpc, centered on the ionized cloud. Note the great similarity between the two spectra. For visualization purposes, data has been filtered with a 0.7 nm-wide median kernel. Thus the actual resolution is 48 (UVB/VIS) and 12 (NIR) times higher than shown for the UVB/VIS and (NIR) channels respectively.

Unravelling the emission signature of a quasar ionization echo 

In May 2015, a study was accepted for publication in MNRAS titled: "The "Green Bean" Galaxy SDSS J224024.1--092748: Unravelling the emission signature of a quasar ionization echo."

The abstract states: "'Green Bean' galaxies (GBs) are the most [O III]-luminous type-2 active galactic nuclei (AGN) at z ˜ 0.3. However, their infrared luminosities reveal AGN in very low activity states, indicating that their gas reservoirs must be ionized by photons from a recent high activity episode - we are observing quasar ionization echoes." Further on: "Our analysis of J224024.1-092748 indicates that GBs provide a unique fossil record of the transformation from the most luminous quasars to weak AGN."

AGN ionization echoes, thermal echoes, and ionization deficits 

In July 2016, a study was accepted for publication in MNRAS titled: "About AGN ionization echoes, thermal echoes, and ionization deficits in low redshift Lyman-alpha blobs". GBGs are thought to be low redshift examples of 'Lyman alpha blobs' (LABs).

The abstract states: "We report the discovery of 14 Lyman-alpha blobs (LABs) at z~0.3, existing at least 4-7 billion years later in the Universe than all other LABs known." Further on: "Because of their proximity and high flux densities, GBs are perfect targets to study AGN feedback, mode switching and the Ly-alpha escape."

See also

References

Galaxy morphological types
Galaxies